= Moleen, Nevada =

Extinct town in Elko Country, Nevada

Coordinates: 40°44′19″N 115°56′51″W

Moleen is an extinct town in Elko County, Nevada. The Geographic Names Information System classifies it as a populated place.

== History ==
The first settlement at Moleen was made in 1869. In 1941, Moleen had 10 inhabitants.
